Brackentown is an unincorporated community in Sumner County, Tennessee, in the United States.

History
A post office called Brackentown was established in 1877, and remained in operation until it was discontinued in 1908. Brackentown was likely named for a member of the local Bracken family who appear in mid-19th century census records.

References

Unincorporated communities in Sumner County, Tennessee
Unincorporated communities in Tennessee